Iny or INY may refer to:
 Ini (pharaoh), a king at Thebes, Egypt, during the 8th century BCE
 I ♥ NY, the basis of a tourism campaign by the city of New York
 Julie Iny, an American activist and author
 Karajá people, a tribe indigenous to the Brazilian Amazon